Izbiceni is a commune in Olt County, Oltenia, Romania. It is composed of a single village, Izbiceni.

The commune is situated at the southern edge of the Wallachian Plain, on the right bank of the Olt River, close to where the river flows into the Danube. 

The nearest town is Corabia, a port on the Danube,  to the west. Teleorman County is on the left side of the Olt, with the port city of Turnu Măgurele  to the southeast.

Natives
 Franț Țandără (1930–2004), convicted killer and self-described torturer for the Securitate

References

Communes in Olt County
Localities in Oltenia